Opus Dei is a personal prelature of the Catholic Church.

Opus Dei may also refer to:
 Opus Dei (album), an album by Laibach
 Opus Dei (book), a 2005 book by John L. Allen Jr.
 Opus Dei, prayers in the Liturgy of the Hours of the Catholic Church